Fehlbaum is a common Swiss family name, literally meaning "missing" or "faulty" (Fehl-) + tree (Baum). Notable people with the surname include:

 Rolf Fehlbaum (born 1941), former Chairman of Swiss furniture company Vitra.
 Tim Fehlbaum  (born 1982), Swiss film director

References

Surnames of Swiss origin